Wolff is a variant of the Wolf surname which is derived from the baptismal names Wolfgang or Wolfram.

List of people surnamed Wolff

A
 Albert Wolff (disambiguation), several people
 Alex Wolff, American actor
 Alexander Wolff, American writer
 Alexander Wolff (soldier), (1788–1863), British officer who served under the Duke of Wellington

B
 Betje Wolff (1738–1804), Dutch writer
 Bernard Wolff (1811–1879), German media mogul
 Beverly Wolff (1928–2005), American mezzo-soprano
 Bobby Wolff (born 1932), American bribe player

C
 Carl Gustaf Wolff, a prominent Finnish shipowner and businessman
 Caspar Friedrich Wolff (1734–1794), founder of embryology
 Christian Wolff (disambiguation), several people
 Christoph Wolff (born 1940), German-born musicologist

E
 Ed Wolff (actor) (1907–1966), American actor
 Edward Wolff (born 1946), American economist
Elsie and Mathilde Wolff Van Sandau (alive in 1914), British suffragette sisters
 Enrique Wolff (born 1949), Argentine football player
 Ernst Victor Wolff (1886–1961), German-born classical pianist and harpsichordist

F
 Francis Wolff, photographer and the founder of Blue Note Records
 Francis Wolff (philosopher) (born 1950), French philosopher, see List of French philosophers
 Frank Wolff (disambiguation), several people
 Franklin Merrell-Wolff (1887–1985), an American mystical philosopher
 Freddie Wolff (1910–1988), British sprinter

G
 Geoffrey Wolff (born 1937), American writer

H
 Hans Wolff (aviator) (1895–1918), German flying ace
 Hans Walter Wolff (1911–1993), German biblical scholar
 Hellmuth Wolff (disambiguation), several people
 Heinz Wolff (1928–2017), German-British scientist and television and radio presenter
 Henny Wolff (1896–1965), German soprano concert singer and voice teacher
 Henry Drummond Wolff (1830–1908), English diplomat

I
 Irving Wolff (1894–1982), American physicist

J
 J. Scott Wolff (1878–1958), American politician from Missouri
 Johann Friedrich Wolff (1778–1806), German botanist
 Jonathan Wolff (disambiguation), several people
 Josh Wolff (born 1977), American soccer player
 Joseph Wolff (1795–1862), Jewish Christian missionary from Germany
 Joseph C. Wolff (1849–1896), New York politician
 Julius Wolff (disambiguation), several people
 Johannes "Hans" Hermann Wolff (1896–1976), German Engineer

K
 Karin Wolff (1959), German politician
 Karl Wolff (1900–1984), high-ranking member of the Schutzstaffel
 Karl Felix Wolff (1879–1966), self-taught folklorist of the South Tyrol
 Kurt Wolff (disambiguation), several people

L
 Lester L. Wolff (1919–2021), American politician
 Louis Wolff (1898–1972), American cardiologist

M
 Maritta Wolff (1918–2002) American novelist
 Elsie and Mathilde Wolff Van Sandau (died 1926), British suffragette sisters
 Matthew Wolff (born 1999), American golfer
 Michael Wolff (disambiguation), several people
 Milton Wolff (1915–2008), commander of the Lincoln Battalion

N
 Nat Wolff (born 1994), American actor
 Nelson Wolff (born 1940), American politician

O
 Otto Herbert Wolff (1920–2010) German-British paediatrician

P
 Patrick Wolff (born 1968), American chess player
 Peter Wolff (disambiguation), several people

R
 Richard Wolff (disambiguation), several people
 Rikard Wolff (1958–2017), Swedish actor
 Robert Wolff (disambiguation), several people
 Roger Wolff (1911–1994), American baseball player

S
 S. Drummond Wolff (1916–2004), English organist, mainly active in America
 Salomon (Sam) de Wolff (1878–1960), Dutch economist and politician
 Sam Wolff (born 1991), American baseball player
 Sheldon Wolff (1928–2008), American radiobiologist and cytogeneticist
 Sheldon M. Wolff (1930–1994), American physician and immunologist
 Stefan Wolff, German political scientist and professor living in the UK
 Sula Wolff (1924–2009), prominent British child psychiatrist
 Susie Wolff (born 1982), British racing driver

T
 Theodor Wolff (1868–1943), German journalist
 Thomas Wolff (1954–2000), American mathematician
 Tobias Barrington Wolff (born 1970), American professor of law
 Tobias Wolff (born 1945), American writer
 Toto Wolff (born 1972), Austrian racing driver and investor

V
 Virginia Euwer Wolff (1882–1941), English writer
 Victoria Wolff (1903–1992), German born American writer and screenwriter.

W
 Werner Wolff (disambiguation), several people
 William Wolff (1927–2020), German-British journalist and rabbi

See also
Wolff v. McDonnell, a U.S. Supreme Court case

German-language surnames
Jewish surnames
Yiddish-language surnames
Surnames from given names